The Imaginary is a 2014 British children's novel written by A. F. Harrold and illustrated by Emily Gravett. It is about a small girl, Amanda, and her imaginary friend, Rudger. An anime film adaptation by Studio Ponoc has been announced. Initially set for a Q3 2022 release, it was later delayed to Q1 2023 due to production issues.

Reception
A review in the Booklist of The Imaginary wrote "Though not quite as innovative as it might be, this is nevertheless a winningly whimsical celebration of the imagination, beautifully enhanced by both black-and-white and full-color illustrations by Kate Greenaway Medal-winning Gravett." and, in a starred review, Kirkus Reviews found it "Wonderfully entertaining."

The Imaginary has also been reviewed by The New York Times, the School Library Journal, The Horn Book Magazine, Publishers Weekly, Library Media Connection, Common Sense Media, Reading Time, The Bulletin of the Center for Children's Books, the Financial Times, and The Guardian (child review).

It was nominated for the 2016 Carnegie Medal, the 2016 Kate Greenaway Medal, and won the 2015 British Book Design and Production Awards Children's Trade Book Award, and the 2015 British Book Design and Production Awards Book of the Year Award.

References

External links

Library holdings of The Imaginary

2014 British novels
British children's novels
Bloomsbury Publishing books